Josh Flook is an Australian rugby union player who plays for the  in Super Rugby. His playing position is wing. He was named in the Reds squad for round 1 of the Super Rugby AU competition in 2020.

Flook scored a crucial try in the Reds' victory over the Brumbies late in the 2021 Super Rugby AU season, a win that would secure Queensland's first home Grand Final since 2011. Flook cut through the line and bumped off a Wallaby to cross in the corner.

Reference list

External links
Rugby.com.au profile
itsrugby.co.uk profile

Australian rugby union players
Living people
Rugby union wings
2001 births
Rugby union centres
Queensland Reds players